Andrzej Rojewski (born 20 August 1985) is a Polish handball player. He is currently a free agent

References

External links

1985 births
Living people
People from Wejherowo
Polish male handball players
Expatriate handball players
Polish expatriate sportspeople in Germany
Handball-Bundesliga players